Wells River is a village in the town of Newbury in Orange County, Vermont, United States. The population was 431 at the 2020 census. The village center is located at the junction of U.S. Routes 5 and 302.

The village center (the portion near the confluence of the Wells River and the Connecticut River) was added to the National Register of Historic Places in 1983 as Wells River Village Historic District. It includes examples of Classical Revival, Federal, and Late Victorian styles. The architectural character of the district represents the building traditions of nineteenth-century Vermont, showcasing a wide array of building styles.

History

The area was first called Governor's Right because  were granted to Governor Benning Wentworth of New Hampshire. It was purchased by Er Chamberlin, who built a gristmill on the Wells River. Located at the head of navigation for the Connecticut River, Wells River developed as a center for trade. Canal boats guided by long poles floated downriver laden with lumber, clapboards and shingles, returning with goods such as iron, salt, rum and molasses.  In the 1830s and 1840s, Jacob Kent Jr. was the proprietor of the Coosuck House, a well-known Wells River hotel.

On November 6, 1848, the Connecticut and Passumpsic Rivers Railroad opened to Wells River, rendering obsolete the river's barge traffic. In 1853–1854, the Boston, Concord and Montreal Railroad reached Woodsville, New Hampshire across the Connecticut River. It built division offices and repair facilities, transforming that village into a booming railway town. The line replaced the 1805 bridge over the narrows to Wells River with a two-level wooden span which combined a toll highway deck at the bottom of the truss, with railroad tracks on the roof. In 1903, a steel bridge of similar configuration replaced it. In 1873, the Montpelier and Wells River Railroad was completed, enhancing the region's position as a railroad junction.

Historic buildings

Some of the more significant historic structures in the village are:
Wells River Congregational Church, Main Street, 1839, 1869, 1894
Wells River Graded School, Main Street, 1874 (listed separately on the National Register)
Mulliken-Davis Store, Main Street, 
U.S. Post Office, 26 Main Street:
Baldwin Memorial Library, Main Street, 
G. Gould House, 7 Main Street, 
Baldwin-Simonds House, North end of Main Street, 
Wells River Village Hall, Cross Street, 1908

Geography
The village takes its name from the Wells River, which flows into the Connecticut River at the eastern edge of the village.  According to the United States Census Bureau, the village has a total area of 2.0 square miles (5.1 km2), all of it land.

Wells River is crossed by Interstate 91, U.S. Route 5, and U.S. Route 302, with Routes 5 and 302 briefly running concurrently, before Route 302 crosses the Connecticut River into New Hampshire.

Demographics

As of the census of 2000, there were 325 people, 156 households, and 92 families residing in the village.  The population density was 167.0 people per square mile (64.4/km2).  There were 178 housing units at an average density of 91.5/sq mi (35.2/km2).  The racial makeup of the village was 99.69% White and 0.31% African American.

There were 156 households, out of which 25.0% had children under the age of 18 living with them, 42.3% were married couples living together, 11.5% had a female householder with no husband present, and 40.4% were non-families. 39.1% of all households were made up of individuals, and 19.2% had someone living alone who was 65 years of age or older.  The average household size was 2.08 and the average family size was 2.67.

In the village, the population was spread out, with 23.1% under the age of 18, 5.8% from 18 to 24, 22.8% from 25 to 44, 24.9% from 45 to 64, and 23.4% who were 65 years of age or older.  The median age was 44 years. For every 100 females, there were 77.6 males.  For every 100 females age 18 and over, there were 83.8 males.

The median income for a household in the village was $28,021, and the median income for a family was $32,708. Males had a median income of $28,056 versus $21,250 for females. The per capita income for the village was $14,705.  About 6.5% of families and 11.1% of the population were below the poverty line, including 6.1% of those under age 18 and 2.1% of those age 65 or over.

Notable people
Jacob Kent Jr., hotel proprietor, public official who served as Orange County Sheriff and U.S. Marshal for Vermont
William A. Russell, U.S. Congressman from Massachusetts
Abel Underwood, Vermont prosecutor, legislator, and judge

See also
National Register of Historic Places listings in Orange County, Vermont

References

External links

 Baldwin Memorial Library
 Wells River Village Historic District

 
Federal architecture in Vermont
Neoclassical architecture in Vermont
Incorporated villages in Vermont
Wells River
Vermont populated places on the Connecticut River
Villages in Orange County, Vermont
Historic districts on the National Register of Historic Places in Vermont
National Register of Historic Places in Orange County, Vermont
Railway towns in Vermont